Chirag (Aghul: Хьургъни) is a rural locality (a selo) in Agulsky District, Republic of Dagestan, Russia. The population was 545 as of 2010.

Geography 
Chirag is located on the Chiragchay River, 19 km northwest of Tpig (the district's administrative centre) by road. Richa is the nearest rural locality.

References 

Rural localities in Agulsky District